Begala is a surname. Notable people with the surname include:

Joe Begala (1906–1978), American football and collegiate wrestling coach
John A. Begala, American politician
Matúš Begala (born 2001), Slovak football midfielder
Paul Begala (born 1961), American political consultant and political commentator
Roman Begala (born 1999), Slovak football player

See also
 

Slovak-language surnames